Ted Spencer is the former head coach for the Fairfield Stags men's lacrosse team. Currently, he is serving at the associate director of athletics at Fairfield University.

Spencer has led the Stags to success in the NCAA Tournament with appearances in 2002 and 2005 after winning the Great Western Lacrosse League Championships in those seasons. He also led the Stags to two ECAC Tournament Championships (1998 and 1999), and three MAAC Championships (1996, 1997 and 1998). He also has developed two All-Americans, 18 All-New England selections and eight Academic All-New England selections. Spencer was selected GWLL Coach of the Year in 2002 and 2005, as well as the 1996 MAAC Coach of the Year.

He is a 1985 graduate of the University of Massachusetts Amherst where he was defensive long-pole midfielder for the men's lacrosse team.

Spencer was the head coach, also, of the Monte Vista (California) high school lacrosse team from 2013 to 2015.

He is now the head coach for the Westerly High School (Rhode Island) Boys Lacrosse team for 2019–Present.

He resides in Fairfield, Connecticut., with his wife, Denise, and their children, Ryan-Elizabeth, Ben, and Devin.

He is now coaching for Westerly High School and has led them to championships after playing a defeated season

References

External links
 Blue Chip Profile
 Fairfield Stags Profile
 2006 Interview of Ted Spencer on The Sports Page

Year of birth missing (living people)
Living people
Brown Bears men's lacrosse coaches
Yale Bulldogs men's lacrosse coaches
Fairfield Stags men's lacrosse coaches
UMass Minutemen lacrosse players
Sportspeople from Fairfield, Connecticut